Annie Laurendeau (born 10 September 1968) is a Canadian former alpine skier who competed in the 1992 Winter Olympics.

References

1968 births
Living people
Canadian female alpine skiers
Olympic alpine skiers of Canada
Alpine skiers at the 1992 Winter Olympics